Granville Brothers Aircraft was an aircraft manufacturer from 1929 until its bankruptcy in 1934 that was located at the Springfield Airport in Springfield, Massachusetts. The Granville Brothers—Zantford, Thomas, Robert, Mark and Edward—are best known for the three Gee Bee Super Sportster racers, the Models Z, R-1 and R-2. Prior to building aircraft, Zantford ran a mobile aircraft repair service.

Aircraft
Data from:Aerofiles
The Granville Brothers completed 25 aircraft of which only two original aircraft are known to still exist.

Replica and reproduction Gee Bee aircraft

A Model E replica was flown and wrecked before being donated to the Evergreen Aviation & Space Museum in McMinnville, Oregon.
Another Model E replica was being built in Australia.

A replica of Florence Klingensmith's Model YL was completed in 1984 powered by a  Lycoming R-680.

A Model Z replica first flown in 1978 was used by the Walt Disney Company in the film The Rocketeer (1991), which is now on display at the Seattle Museum of Flight. A second Gee Bee Z replica was sold to Fantasy of Flight.

The New England Air Museum and the San Diego Air & Space Museum have each completed replica R-1s with help from the Granville's under the agreement that the aircraft will never be flown.
The Crawford Auto-Aviation Museum in Cleveland, Ohio also has an R-1 replica on display as of June 2018.
The Springfield, Massachusetts Museum of Springfield History has a full size static fiberglass replica of the R-1 hanging in the atrium.
A Gee Bee R-2 Super Sportster replica flown extensively since 1991 is now at Fantasy of Flight.

A highly modified replica of the Gee Bee R-6 powered by a  Wright R-1820 Cyclone was first flown on 26 September 2013.

See also
New Hampshire Historical Marker No. 207: Granville Homestead

References

Notes

Bibliography

 Benjamin, Delmar and Steve Wolf. Gee Bee. St. Paul, Minnesota: MBI Publishing Co., 1993. .
 Bowers, Pete M. The Gee Bee Racers — Number 51.  Leatherhead, Surrey, UK: Profile Publications Ltd., 1965.
 Granville, J.I. Farmers Take Flight. Springfield, Massachusetts: Copy Cat Print Shop, 2000. .
 Haffke, Henry A. Gee Bee: The Real Story of the Granville Brothers and Their Marvelous Airplanes.Colorado Springs, Colorado: VIP Publishers, Inc., 1989. .
 Mendenhall, Charles A. and Tom Murphy. The Gee Bee Racers: A Legacy of Speed. North Branch, Minnesota: Specialty Press, 1994. .
 Schmid, S.H. and Truman C. Weaver. The Golden Age of Air Racing: Pre-1940, 2nd rev. edition (EAA Historical Series). Osceola, Wisconsin: MBI Publishing Co., 1991. .
 Those Incredible Gee Bees (VHS 60 min). Springfield, Massachusetts: Studio 16, 1992.

External links

Geebee Model Q Ascender video

Defunct aircraft manufacturers of the United States
Manufacturing companies based in Springfield, Massachusetts
Manufacturing companies established in 1929
Manufacturing companies disestablished in 1934
1929 establishments in Massachusetts
1934 disestablishments in Massachusetts